One or 1 is the first natural number.

1, one, or ONE may also refer to:
 AD 1, first year of the AD era
 1 BC, the year before AD 1
 One (pronoun), a pronoun in the English language
 Hydrogen, with an atomic number of 1
 The month of January, the first month of the year in the Julian and Gregorian calendars

Places
 Ona, Vestland (sometimes spelled One), an island in Øygarden, Norway
 L'One, a river that joins the Pique in Bagnères-de-Luchon, France
 The number of the French department Ain

Companies
 Ocean Network Express, a Japanese global transport company
 One (Telekom Slovenija Group), a Macedonian GSM/UMTS mobile operator
 National Express East Anglia, previously branded as One, an English train operating company
 Orange Austria, previously ONE, an Austrian mobile network operator
 One Enterprises, a production company founded by American hip-hop artist Akir
 One Aviation, a defunct American aircraft manufacturer

Electronics
 Android One, a line of consumer electronics
 Elonex ONE, or simply ONE, a subnotebook computer
 GeeksPhone One, an Android smartphone
 HTC One series, a series of Android smartphones produced by Taiwanese manufacturer HTC
 OnePlus One, the first Android smartphone released by Chinese smartphone manufacturer OnePlus
 PS One, a smaller version of the original Sony PlayStation games console
 Red Hydrogen One, an Android smartphone
 The Red One (camera), the first camera released by the Red Digital Cinema Camera Company
 Xbox One, an eighth-generation games console by Microsoft

Organizations
 One (sixth form college), a college in Ipswich, England
 ONE, Inc., a gay rights organization founded in the United States in 1952
 One Campaign, a campaign to fight global AIDS and poverty
 ONE Championship, a mixed martial arts organization founded in Singapore in 2011
 Office of National Estimates, a forerunner of the U.S. National Intelligence Council
 Organisation of National Ex-Servicemen (O.N.E.), an organization of veterans of military service in Ireland

Music

Songs
 "1", by Joy Zipper
 "One" (Aimer song), 2017
 "One" (Ami Suzuki song), 2008
 "One" (Bee Gees song), 1989
 "One" (A Chorus Line song), 1974
 "One" (Creed song), 1999
 "One" (Crystal Kay song), 2008
 "One" (Ed Sheeran song), 2014
 "One" (Fat Joe song), 2009
 "One" (Harry Nilsson song), made famous by Three Dog Night
 "One" (JayKo song), 2009
 "One" (Metallica song), 1988
 "One" (Sky Ferreira song), 2010
 "One" (Swedish House Mafia song), 2010
 "One" (U2 song), 1991
 "One (Always Hardcore)", by Scooter
 "One (Blake's Got a New Face)", by Vampire Weekend
 "O.N.E." (song), by Yeasayer
 "One", by Alanis Morissette from Supposed Former Infatuation Junkie
 "One", by Ane Brun from It All Starts with One
 "One", by Coheed and Cambria from Year of the Black Rainbow
 "One", by Epik High from Pieces, Part One
 "One", by Faith Hill from Cry
 "One", by Ghostface Killah from Supreme Clientele
 "One", by Immortal Technique from Revolutionary Vol. 2
 "One", by Kumi Koda from Grow into One
 "One", by Lady Gaga
 "One", by Lewis Capaldi from Divinely Uninspired to a Hellish Extent
 "One!", by Misia from Love Is the Message
 "One", by Parachute Band from Roadmaps and Revelations
 "One", by Rapture Ruckus
 "One", by Rip Slyme from Tokyo Classic
 "One", by Shapeshifter from Soulstice
 "One", by Simple Plan from Still Not Getting Any...
 "One", by Soulfly from 3
 "One", by Sunny Day Real Estate from The Rising Tide
 "One", by Tasman Keith and Kwame, 2021
 "One", by TVXQ from Heart, Mind and Soul
 "One", by Wicked Wisdom from Wicked Wisdom
 "One", by Zion I from Mind Over Matter
 "One", from the musical Bare: A Pop Opera
 "One", by Karma to Burn from the album Wild, Wonderful Purgatory, 1999

EPs
 #1 (Suburban Kids with Biblical Names EP), 2004
 One (Alli Rogers EP), 2005
 One (Angela Aki EP), 2005
 One, by The Brian Jonestown Massacre
 One (Charlotte Church EP), 2012
 One, by Debby and the Never Ending
 One (Hillsong United EP), 1998
 ONE (Lee Gikwang EP), 2017
 One (Ra EP), 2000
 One (Tying Tiffany EP), 2013
 The Beatles (No. 1), by The Beatles, also known as simply No. 1

Albums
 1 (B1A4 album), 2012
 1 (Beatles album), a compilation released in 2000
 1 (The Black Heart Procession album), 1998
 #1 (Demy album), 2012
 #1 (Fischerspooner album), 2001
 1 (Julio Iglesias album), a greatest hits album, 2011
 1: The Collection, a greatest hits album by Julio Iglesias, 2014   
 1 (The Motors album), 1977
 1 (Pole album), 1998
 1 (Zara Larsson album), 2014
 I (Cursed album), 2003, later reissued as "One"
1.0 (album), an album by Black Rain
 One (Ahmad Jamal album), 1979
 One (Angela Aki EP), 2005
 One (Arashi album), 2005
 One (Bee Gees album), 1989
 One (Bob James album), 1974
 One (Bonnie Pink album), 2009
 One, by Crown City Rockers, 2001
 One, by C418, 2012
 One (Dirty Vegas album), 2004
 One (Edita Abdieski album), 2011
 One (George Jones and Tammy Wynette album), 1995
 One (Ida Corr album), 2008
 One (Maher Zain album), 2016
 One (Matthew Shipp album), 2005
 One (Me Phi Me album), 1992
 One (Neal Morse album), 2004
 One (NoMeansNo album), 2000
 One (The Panic Channel album), often stylized ONe, 2006
 One, by Planetshakers, 2009
 One, by Sarah Burgess, 2008
 One (Sister2Sister album), 2000
 One (Tesseract album), 2011
 One, an alternate title for the self-titled Three Dog Night, 1968
 One (Yuval Ron album), 2003
 One (Hellbound), by Demiricous, 2006

Other
 One (band), a Greek Cypriot boys band
 One (opera), a 2003 chamber opera by Michel van der Aa

Entertainment

Literature
 One (Conrad Williams novel), the 2010 British Fantasy Award winner for Best Novel
 One (Crossan novel), the 2016 Carnegie Medal winning work by Sarah Crossan
 One (David Karp novel), a 1953 dystopian novel, also published as Escape to Nowhere
 One (Bach novel), a 1988 novel by Richard Bach
 One (manga artist), pseudonym of a Japanese manga artist

Film

 One: The Movie, a 2005 documentary about the meaning of life
 1 (2009 film), a 2009 Hungarian film by Pater Sparrow
 1 (2013 film), a 2013 film about Formula One
 1: Nenokkadine, a 2014 Telugu film starring Mahesh Babu
 One (2017 film),  an Indian Bengali crime thriller by Birsa Dasgupta
 One (2021 film), an Indian Malayalam-language political thriller film

Magazines
 One, the first U.S. homophile magazine, published by One, Inc. from 1953 to 1969
 One, a magazine published by the Catholic Near East Welfare Association
 ONE, a magazine published by the National Association of Free Will Baptists

Radio
 One (radio series), a British comedy series by David Quantick

Television
 Channel 1 (disambiguation)
 TV1 (disambiguation)
 10 Bold, an Australian television channel, formerly known as One
 One (Australian TV channel), free-to-air channel that commenced in 2009
 One (Canadian TV channel)
 One (German TV channel)
 One (Maltese TV channel)
 One (Southeast Asia TV channel)
 "One" (Law & Order: Criminal Intent), a 2001 episode of Law & Order: Criminal Intent
 "One" (Star Trek: Voyager), a 1998 episode of Star Trek: Voyager
 "One" (Casualty), a 2017 episode of Casualty
 NY1, a local news channel in New York City
 RTÉ One, an Irish television station
 BBC One, a British television station
 TF1, a French television channel
 SVT1, a Swedish television channel
 RTP1, a Portuguese television channel

Video games
 One (video game), a video game released in 1997 for the Sony PlayStation
 One (N-Gage game), a 2005 video game for N-Gage and N-Gage 2.0
 One: Kagayaku Kisetsu e, a 1998 Japanese video game by Tactics

Transportation

Automobiles
 BMW 1 Series, a subcompact car built since 2004
 Haima 1, a city car built since 2012
 Lynk & Co 01, a compact SUV built since 2017
 Mini Hatch, a three or five door hatchback built since 2000, also known as the Mini One
 Nikola One, a cancelled proposed electric semi-truck tractor unit
 Polestar 1, a plug-in hybrid sports car

Routes
 List of highways numbered 1
 List of public transport routes numbered 1

Other
 OneAircraft One, a Slovenian aircraft design
 A call sign suffix of any official vehicle used for the transportation of the president of the United States, for example Air Force One

Other uses
 One (Enneagram), a personality type
 One (website), an Israeli news site
 Ubuntu One, an online storage service by Canonical Ltd.
 Purina One, a line of pet food products

See also

 -one, a suffix used in organic chemistry to denote the -C(=O)- group
 The One (disambiguation)
 First (disambiguation)
 +1 (disambiguation)
 -1 (disambiguation)
 01 (disambiguation)
 Number One (disambiguation), also spelled "No. 1" or "#1"
 World number 1 (disambiguation)
 Year One (disambiguation)
 One percent (disambiguation)
 Oneness (disambiguation)
 Ones (disambiguation)
 Uno (disambiguation)
 
 
 
 
 
 :Category:Number-one singles, Wikimedia category